Patrick Obasi (15 May 1951 – 16 October 2012), popularly known as Patty Obasi, was a Nigerian gospel recording artist. Regarded as one of the pioneers of Nigerian gospel music, Patty Obasi rose to prominence in 1980 upon the release of his album Nwa Mama Iwota.

Early life
Patrick Obasi was born in Mmaku, a small town in Awgu local government area of Enugu State, Nigeria where he began his singing career.

Career 
He released his debut album Bianu Kanyi Kele Jehova and went on to release over 15 studio albums.

Discography

Bianu Kanyi Kele Jehova
Onye Isi Agha
Nwa Mama Iwota
Okara Akapa
Billionaire in a Crate
Walking with Jesus
Ezi Nwayi Di Ukor
Ubanase

Later life and death
Obasi died in his residence on 16 October 2012 after suffering from kidney failure.

See also
 List of Nigerian gospel musicians

References

1951 births
2012 deaths
20th-century Nigerian male singers
Igbo musicians
Nigerian gospel singers
Deaths from kidney failure
People from Enugu State